Lights at Night was the first studio album by The Hong Kong.

Track listing 

 "Cryptazoic" - 5:41
 "Lifestylz" - 3:14
 "Squaretriangle" - 3:12
 "Winning Mission" - 6:30
 "Secret Weapons" - 7:53	
 "Sunward Ho" - 4:06

References
 eMusic album profile

2000 debut albums
The Hong Kong albums
The Orchard (company) albums